The 2001 European Championship of Ski mountaineering was the fourth European Championship of ski mountaineering and the first, that was organized by the International Council for Ski Mountaineering Competitions (ISMC), that was founded in 1999 as a suborganization the Union Internationale des Associations d'Alpinisme (UIAA).

The events were held in France, Italy and Spain. The team races of the "senior" and the "espoir" class were held at the French Miage-Contamines on 27 January 2001, the individual races in the Jaca, Spain, on 4 March 2001, and the team races of the "cadett" and the "junior" classes in Adamello, Italy, on 1 April 2001.

Results

Medals 

(alphabetic order; only "seniors" and "espoirs", without the results of "cadets" and "juniors")

*) winning result of the combined Spanish-Andorran "Espoirs" women team

Team 
Event held in Les Contamines, France, on 27 January 2001

List of the best 10 teams by gender:

Individual 

Event held on 4 March 2001, in Jaca, Spain

List of the best 10 participants by gender:

References 

2001
Ski
International sports competitions hosted by France
International sports competitions hosted by Italy
European
2001 in ski mountaineering
Skiing competitions in Italy
Skiing competitions in France
Skiing competitions in Spain